
Pointless Walks to Dismal Places is the debut album by the band Prolapse. It was released in October 1994 on Cherry Red Records. The album was recorded at Bang Bang Studios, London by Steve Mack.

The album was originally released by Cherry Red Records on 12” vinyl and CD. The initial 930 copies of the vinyl LP came in a numbered, hand-painted outer sleeve.

Track listing
All songs written by Prolapse.

Personnel

Band
 David Jeffreys - guitar
 Linda Steelyard - vocals
 Mick Derrick - vocals
 Mick Harrison - bass
 Pat Marsden - guitar
 Tim Pattinson - drums

Production
 Produced and engineered by Steve Mack
 Assisted by Natalie and Jane
 Photos by Rob Jacobs
 Negatives by Claire Morales

References

1994 albums
Cherry Red Records albums
Prolapse (band) albums